A faering is an open boat with two pairs of oars, commonly found in most boat-building traditions in western and northern Scandinavia.

History
Faerings are clinker-built, with planks overlapped and riveted together to form the hull. This type of boat has a history dating back to Viking-era Scandinavia. The small boats found with the 9th century Gokstad ship resemble those still used in Western and Northern Norway, and testify to a long tradition of boat building.  Faerings may carry a small sail, traditionally a square sail, in addition to oars.  The only significant difference being a conversion from a side-mounted rudder to stern-mounted. They are used as small fishing vessels in areas of modern Norway, and occasionally raced.

Etymology
The word faering comes from the Norwegian word færing (Old Norse feræringr), literally meaning "four-oaring".

See also
Knarr
Spritsail
Oselvar
Nordland

References

Other sources
 Greenhill, Basil (1976) Archaeology of the Boat (London: Adam and Charles Black Publishers Ltd) 
 Leather, John (1990) Clinker Boatbuilding (Adlard Coles) 

Boat types